Sajóvámos is a village in Borsod-Abaúj-Zemplén County in northeastern Hungary.

Ethnic groups
In 2011 Census

Population pyramid
Estimate data from 2011 (population:2213)

 0–14 years: 414 people = 18.7% 
 15–60 years: 1487 people = 67.2% 
 60 years or older: 312 people = 14.1%

References

Populated places in Borsod-Abaúj-Zemplén County